Martiany  (German Mertenheim) is a village in the administrative district of Gmina Kętrzyn, within Kętrzyn County, Warmian-Masurian Voivodeship, in northern Poland.

The village has a population of 160.

References

Martiany